Lee Ziemba (born March 29, 1989) is a former American football offensive tackle who played in the National Football League (NFL).  He played college football for Auburn University, where he earned consensus All-American honors and won the 2011 BCS National Championship. The Carolina Panthers drafted Ziemba in the seventh round of the 2011 NFL Draft.

Early years
Ziemba was born in Albany, Georgia.  He attended Rogers High School in Rogers, Arkansas, where he played for the Rogers Mounties high school football team. He registered 31 pancake blocks, 43 knockdown blocks and was in on 11 tackles and 1.5 sacks playing defense in goal line situations as a senior.  He received high school All-American honors from Parade magazine and USA Today.

Considered a four-star recruit by Rivals.com, Ziemba was listed as the No. 4 offensive tackle prospect in the nation.

College career
Ziemba attended Auburn University, and played for the Auburn Tigers football team from 2007 to 2010.  He started every game during his four years at Auburn.  As a true freshman in 2007, Ziemba received Freshman All-American honors by College Football News, The Sporting News, and Rivals.com.

The 2010 Iron Bowl against Alabama marked Ziemba's 50th start, breaking the previous school record for most starts. By starting in the BCS National Championship, Ziemba extended his record to 52 starts.

As a senior, Ziemba was named to the 2010 AFCA Coaches’ All-America team. He also won the Jacobs Blocking Trophy, an award given to the SEC's best blocker.

Professional career

Carolina Panthers
Ziemba was selected by the Carolina Panthers in the seventh round with the 244th overall pick in the 2011 NFL Draft. He was waived/injured on August 10, 2012, and subsequently reverted to injured reserve on August 12.

References

External links
 
 Carolina Panthers bio
 Auburn Tigers bio

1989 births
Living people
Sportspeople from Albany, Georgia
People from Rogers, Arkansas
Players of American football from Arkansas
Rogers High School (Arkansas) alumni
All-American college football players
American football offensive tackles
Auburn Tigers football players
Carolina Panthers players
American people of Polish descent